Joseph Merille Ernest "Ty" Arbour (June 29, 1896 – February 11, 1979) was a professional ice hockey player in the National Hockey League and the Western Canada Hockey League.

Arbour was born in Waubaushene, Ontario. The elder brother of Jack Arbour, Ty began his career out west following his service during World War I. He would go on to play for the Pittsburgh Pirates and captain the Chicago Black Hawks of the NHL before finishing his career in the minors.

Career statistics

Regular season and playoffs

References

External links
 

1896 births
1979 deaths
Buffalo Bisons (IHL) players
Canadian ice hockey left wingers
Canadian military personnel of World War I
Chicago Blackhawks captains
Chicago Blackhawks players
Edmonton Eskimos (ice hockey) players
Ice hockey people from Simcoe County
North West Hockey League players
Pittsburgh Pirates (NHL) players
Pittsburgh Yellow Jackets (IHL) players
Vancouver Maroons players